Gheorghe Nițu (born 19 November 1960) is a Romanian former footballer who played as a goalkeeper. After he ended his playing career, Nițu worked as a goalkeeper coach for various teams.

References

1960 births
Living people
Romanian footballers
Romania under-21 international footballers
Association football goalkeepers
Liga I players
Liga II players
Süper Lig players
Nemzeti Bajnokság I players
Victoria București players
FCV Farul Constanța players
FC Olt Scornicești players
FC Steaua București players
FC Argeș Pitești players
FC Sportul Studențesc București players
CSM Ceahlăul Piatra Neamț players
Budapesti VSC footballers
Bursaspor footballers
Romanian expatriate footballers
Expatriate footballers in Turkey
Expatriate sportspeople in Turkey
Romanian expatriate sportspeople in Turkey
Expatriate footballers in Hungary
Expatriate sportspeople in Hungary
Romanian expatriates in Hungary
Romanian expatriate sportspeople in Hungary
Sportspeople from Pitești